The World Allround Speed Skating Championships for Men took place on 28 and 29 February 1976 in Heerenveen at the Thialf ice rink.

Classification

 DQ = Disqualified
 * = Fell

Source:

Attribution
In Dutch

References 

World Allround Speed Skating Championships, 1976
1976 World Allround